The 2016 Critérium du Dauphiné was the 68th edition of the Critérium du Dauphiné cycling stage race. The eight-stage race began in Les Gets on 5 June and concluded in SuperDévoluy on 12 June, and is sixteenth of the twenty-eight races in the 2016 UCI World Tour season. The Dauphiné is viewed as a preview for July's Tour de France and a number of the contenders for the general classification of the Tour participated in the race.

The race was won by Chris Froome of Team Sky, successfully defending his title from the year before and becoming the fifth man to win the event three times.  He won by 12 seconds over Romain Bardet of AG2R La Mondiale, with Dan Martin of Etixx-Quick-Step rounding out the podium.

Edvald Boasson Hagen of Team Dimension Data took the green jersey as winner of the points competition, while teammate Daniel Teklehaimanot took the mountains classification for the second consecutive year.  Julian Alaphilippe of Etixx-Quick-Step won the young riders classification, and Team Sky won the teams classification.

Teams 
All 18 UCI WorldTeams were automatically invited and were obliged to attend the race. Four wildcard teams were also invited.

Route

Stages

Prologue 
5 June 2016 – Les Gets,  individual time trial (ITT)

Stage 1 
6 June 2016 – Cluses to Saint-Vulbas,

Stage 2 
7 June 2016 – Crêches-sur-Saône to Chalmazel-Jeansagnière,

Stage 3 
8 June 2016 – Boën-sur-Lignon to Tournon-sur-Rhône,

Stage 4 
9 June 2016 – Tain-l'Hermitage to Belley,

Stage 5 
10 June 2016 – La Ravoire to Vaujany,

Stage 6 
11 June 2016 – La Rochette to Méribel,

Stage 7 
12 June 2016 – Pont-de-Claix to SuperDévoluy,

Classification leadership 

In the Critérium du Dauphiné, four different jerseys were awarded. The most important was the general classification, which was calculated by adding each rider's finishing times on each stage. The rider with the least accumulated time is the race leader, identified by a yellow jersey with a blue bar; the winner of this classification was considered the winner of the race.

Additionally, there was a points classification, which awarded a green jersey. In the classification, cyclists received points for finishing in the top 10 in a stage. Points towards the classification could also be achieved at each of the intermediate sprints; these points were given to the top three riders through the line with 5 points for first, 3 for second, and 1 point for third.

There was also a mountains classification, the leadership of which was marked by a red jersey with white polka dots. In the mountains classification, points towards the classification were won by reaching the top of a climb before other cyclists. Each climb was categorised as either first, second, third, or fourth-category, with more points available for the higher-categorised climbs. First-category climbs awarded the most points; the first six riders were able to accrue points, compared with the first four on second-category climbs, the first two on third-category and only the first for fourth-category.

The fourth jersey represented the young rider classification, marked by a white jersey. This was decided the same way as the general classification, but only riders born on or after 1 January 1991 were eligible to be ranked in the classification. There was also a team classification, in which the times of the best three cyclists per team on each stage were added together; the leading team at the end of the race was the team with the lowest total time.

Notes
 In stage 1, Richie Porte, who was second in the points classification, wore the green jersey, because Alberto Contador (in first place) wore the yellow jersey as leader of the general classification during that stage. Chris Froome, who was third in the mountains classification, wore the polka dot jersey, because Alberto Contador (in first place) wore the yellow jersey and Richie Porte (in second place) wore the green jersey during that stage.
 In stages 2–5, Richie Porte, who was second in the mountains classification, wore the polka dot jersey, because Alberto Contador (in first place) wore the yellow jersey as leader of the general classification during that stage.

Final standings

General classification

Points classification

Mountains classification

Young rider classification

Team classification

References

External links 
 

2016
2016 UCI World Tour
2016 in French sport
June 2016 sports events in France